Lithostrotion is a genus of rugose coral which is commonly found as a fossil within Carboniferous Limestone. Lithostrotion is a member of the family Lithostrotionidae. The genus Lithostrotion, a common and readily recognised group of fossils, became extinct by the end of the Palaeozoic era.

Species

 Lithostrotion affine Fleming, 1828
 Lithostrotion araneum (McCoy, 1844)
 Lithostrotion banffense Warren, 1927
 Lithostrotion concinum Lonsdale, 1845
 Lithostrotion decipiens (McCoy, 1849)
 Lithostrotion edmondsi Smith, 1928
 Lithostrotion fasciculatum Fleming, 1828
 Lithostrotion fuicatum Thomson, 1887
 Lithostrotion gracile McCoy, 1851
 Lithostrotion irregulare Phillips, 1836
 Lithostrotion junceum Fleming, 1828
 Lithostrotion maccoyanum Milne-Edwards & Haime, 1851
 Lithostrotion martini Milne-Edwards & Haime, 1851
 Lithostrotion mclareni Sutherland, 1958
 Lithostrotion mutabile (Kelly, 1942)
 Lithostrotion pauciradiale McCoy, 1844
 Lithostrotion sinuosum (Kelly, 1942)
 Lithostrotion sociale Phillips, 1836
 Lithostrotion termieri Rodríguez & Somerville in Rodríguez, Somerville & Said, 2017
 Lithostrotion vorticale (Parkinson, 1808)
 Lithostrotion warreni Warren, 1960
tu mai

References 

Rugosa
Prehistoric Anthozoa genera
Fossil taxa described in 1828
Fossils of Georgia (U.S. state)
Paleozoic life of Alberta
Paleozoic life of New Brunswick
Paleozoic life of Nunavut